Deszczno  is a village in Gorzów County, Lubusz Voivodeship, in western Poland. It is the seat of the gmina (administrative district) called Gmina Deszczno.

The settlement in the Neumark region was first mentioned in 1344 deed issued by Margrave Louis of Brandenburg, granting it to the city of Landsberg. 
The village has a population of 1,100.

References

Deszczno